DRG Motorsports (formerly Deware Racing Group) is an American auto racing team, founded in 2012 by Scott DeWare. Based in North Carolina, It fields the No. 86 Chevrolet in the NASCAR Nationwide Series.

The team's driver was Kevin Lepage in 2012. In 2013 it competed in the Nationwide Series with drivers Lepage and Ricky Ehrgott. In 2014, the team returned to the Nationwide Series starting at Richmond International Raceway in April, with Joe Nemechek driving. In 2014 DRG also entered events with drivers Tim Cowen and Jake Crum.

In addition to competing under the No. 86, DRG also provided race preparation and track support for several other teams and drivers from 2012 to 2015. During this period DRG further competed in several ARCA events co/entering the events under the Fox/DRG Racing banner. DRG also has several NASCAR K&N Series starts and has provided driver testing and driver development services.

2016–2018 DRG has been primarily involved with assisting teams with sponsorship and activation services and providing development consultation for new drivers.

Team owner Scott Deware died August 28, 2020.

References

External links
 

Defunct NASCAR teams